Ninguta is a  monotypic  Palearctic butterfly genus in the family Nymphalidae (Satyrinae: Satyrini: Lethina). The genus contains the single species Ninguta schrenckii found in the Russian Far East, Japan, Korea and eastern China.

Subspecies
Ninguta schrenckii schrenckii
Ninguta schrenckii carexivora (Murayama, 1953) (Japan)
Ninguta schrenckii damontas (Fruhstorfer, 1909) (western China: Sichuan)
Ninguta schrenckii iwatensis (Okano, 1954) (Japan)
Ninguta schrenckii kuatunensis (Mell, 1939) (Fukien)
Ninguta schrenckii menalcas (Fruhstorfer, 1909) (Japan)
Ninguta schrenckii niigatana Murayama, 1965 (Japan)
Ninguta schrenckii obscura (Mell, 1942)
Ninguta schrenckii suzukaensis (Mori & Murayama, 1954) (Japan)

References

"Ninguta Moore, [1892]" at Markku Savela's Lepidoptera and Some Other Life Forms
Bozano GC. 1999. Guide to the Butterflies of the Palearctic Region. Satyridae part I: Subfamily Elymniinae, Tribe Lethini. Omnes Artes, Milan.

Satyrinae
Butterflies described in 1859
Taxa named by Frederic Moore
Monotypic butterfly genera